Naseem Hamed vs. Manuel Calvo was a professional boxing match contested between Naseem Hamed and Manuel Calvo for the vacant IBO featherweight title. The bout was held on 18 May 2002 at the London Arena, England. It was Hamed's last fight, and was watched by eleven million viewers in the United Kingdom.

Background
Naseem Hamed had lost his previous fight to Marco Antonio Barrera, giving him first defeat in his professional career and ending his over five year reign as featherweight champion. As per the contract that was signed, Hamed had the option of facing Barrera in an immediate rematch and though he had expressed interest in his post-fight interview, he ultimately decided against it. Hamed eventually announced his intentions to face European featherweight champion Manuel Calvo, who was coming off arguably his biggest victory over former WBO featherweight champion Steve Robinson. However as Calvo was an unknown fighter in the United States, HBO, with whom Hamed had an exclusive contract allowing them to air his fights in the US, objected to Hamed's choice of opponent. Rather than relent as he had the previous year when HBO objected to a proposed Hamed–István Kovács bout, Hamed opted to sever ties with HBO. The fight was also met with several delays. Prior to their separation, HBO offered Hamed a fight to take place on September 8, 2001, but Hamed declined, opting to face Calvo on November 10, 2001 instead. However Hamed postponed the fight as a result of the September 11 attacks. The fight was next rescheduled for March 23, 2002, but a back injury suffered by Hamed during training caused the fight to be postponed again. The fight was then finally set for May 18, 2002.

The fight
Coming off a 13-month hiatus, Hamed looked sluggish and disinterested throughout the fight, abandoning his usual aggressiveness for a slow, tactical approach. Though Hamed clearly outboxed Calvo, many of the 10,000 fans who attended the fight booed throughout. The fight went the full 12 rounds, with Hamed winning by lopsided scores on all three of the judges' scorecards. Two judges had Hamed winning 119–109, each giving Calvo only a single round, while the third had Hamed winning with a score of 120–110. Hamed blamed his lackluster performance on a hand injury he sustained in the second round.

Fight card

References

2002 in boxing
2002 in English sport
Boxing matches
Boxing in England